Coconino station was a stop on the Grand Canyon Railway in Coconino County, Arizona. It was the penultimate stop before reaching Grand Canyon station. The concrete base of the original station and ruins of the section house remain.

References

Populated places in Coconino County, Arizona